Altus or Altos was a fortress town in Mygdonia near Therma (later Thessalonica). The town is mentioned by Stephanus of Byzantium and Theagenes of Macedon.

Its site is unlocated.

References

John Cramer, A Geographic and Historical Description of Ancient Greece (Clarendon Press, 1828), p. 238.

Populated places in ancient Macedonia
Former populated places in Greece
Geography of ancient Mygdonia
Lost ancient cities and towns